Marialejandra Martín Castillo (born November 23, 1964 in Caracas), AKA Mariale Martin, Alejandra Martin & Maria Alejandra Martin, is one of the most recognized Venezuelan actors. Marialejandra made her professional debut in the feature film Ifigenia (1986),  directed by Ivan Feo (1986) and has since worked extensively in film, theater and television. She is well known for her leading role in Por Estas Calles (RCTV 1992-1994), an extremely popular TV show with a very realistic approach to everyday life.

Theater

Filmography

Television

TV films
 La Raya de Cal (Renato Gutierrez, dir. RCTV, Caracas, 1990)
 El Dueño (Carlos Porte, dir. RCTV, Caracas, 1991)
 La Elegida (Carlos Porte, dir. RCTV, Caracas)

Radio
 Algo Más (Host, RQ910 FM, Caracas)
 Radionovelas for Alberto Cimino’s El Universo del Espectáculo (Fiesta106 FM, Rumbos 670AM & 97.7FM)

Training
 The Lee Strasberg Theatre Institute, New York. Tutors: George Loros, Robert Castle, Pennie DuPont, Jeffrey Horne, Geofrey Fergusson, Ilka Lomonaco, Jan Douglas y Michael Margotta.
 Taller del Actor, Caracas. Tutors: Enrique Porte, Santiago Sánchez, María Teresa Haiek.
 Grupo Actoral 80, Caracas. Tutors: Juan Carlos Gené, Verónica Oddó, Felicia Canetti y Alberto Isola.

References

External links
Official homepage

María Alejandra Martín in VenCOR

Living people
Actresses from Caracas
RCTV personalities
Venezuelan telenovela actresses
Venezuelan stage actresses
1964 births
Venezuelan film actresses
Venezuelan television actresses